William Mollison may refer to:
 William Mollison (politician)
 William Mollison (mathematician)